The Book of Beauty by Cecil Beaton was his first published book of photographs. In his concept of beauty, Beaton, with sketches and photographs, highlights actresses such as Tallulah Bankhead and Anna May Wong but also modernist literary figures like Edith Sitwell and Nancy Cunard.

Contents

Lillie Langtry
Lily Elsie
Gaby Deslys
Gina Palerme
Mary Curzon, Lady Howe
The Morgan Sisters (Thelma Furness, Viscountess Furness and Gloria Morgan Vanderbilt)
Gladys Cooper
Rosamond Pinchot
Diana Bridgeman, Lady Abdy
The Beaton Sisters (Nancy Beaton and Baba Beaton)
The Jungman Sisters (Zita Jungman and Baby Jungman)
Edith Sitwell
Virginia Woolf
Hazel Lavery
Tallulah Bankhead
The French Sisters (Essex French and Valerie French)
Lillian Gish
Marion Davies
Norma Shearer
Alice White
Greta Garbo
Irene Castle
Gertrude Lawrence
Lady Eleanor Smith and Lady Pamela Smith
Hon. Daisy Fellowes
Tilly Losch
Vicomtess Alice de Janzé
Marjorie Oelrichs
Mrs Gordon Beckles Wilson
Mona Williams
The Ruthven Twins (Alison Ruthven and Peggy Ruthven)
Paula Gellibrand, Marquise de Casa Maury
Nada Ruffer and Clarita de Uriburu
Freda Dudley Ward
Anita Loos
Adele Astaire
Lady Nancy Cunard
Lady Sylvia Ashley
Lady Diana Cooper

Gallery

References

Photography in England